Mariano Arciero (26 February 1707 – 16 February 1788) was an Italian Roman Catholic priest. He exercised his functions as a priest in Naples as both a pastor and theologian who was later known as the "Apostle of Calabria" due to his tireless apostolate and efforts in evangelization.

His beatification was celebrated on 24 June 2012.

Life
Mariano Arciero was born in Contursi Terme in 1707 to the poor Mattia Arciero and Autilia Marmora. In his childhood he fostered a strong devotion to the Mother of God whom he called "Mamma bella".

The local priest - Emanuele Parisio - took him under his personal care for educational purposes. Parisio instructed him and requested that he teach catechism to his fellow children. He later moved from his home to Naples in 1729 where he attended a Eucharistic Congregation that the Jesuit priest Francesco Pavone established; he enrolled in the congregation on 21 December 1729. It was in a Jesuit college he enrolled in that he did his philosophical studies and also studied literature. It was also during this time that Parisio took charge of his theological studies which allowed for him to be ordained to the priesthood on 22 December 1731.

He soon became a model for his fellow priests: he was active in all charitable acts and visited hospitals and other places to be with his people for his pastoral mission. Gennaro Fortunato - the Bishop of Cassano - desired that Arciero be in his diocese. Arciero devoted himself to the education of children and was known for astonishing conversions. He spent hours teaching catechism to children as well as preaching. To that end he was known as the "Apostle of Calabria" due to his tireless apostolate. The bishop also named him as the first parish priest for Altomonte and then for the Annunciation church (under construction at the time) in Maratea. The death of Fortunato in 1751 prompted him to return to Naples.

In 1768 he was named as the spiritual director for a diocesan congregation for the supervision of priests. He was later named as the director at the direction of Cardinal Antonio Sersale. Arciero spent much time in contemplation of the Eucharist and was known for his frugal manner of living. His dressing habits were kept to a minimum and he slept and ate little.

Arciero died in 1788 at 4:00pm after suffering from ill health. Following his death Mary Frances of the Five Wounds saw the angels guide his soul to Heaven. His remains were kept in state for just under a week in order to accommodate the long stream of Neapolitans who came to see him as a farewell. His remains were later moved on 15 October 1950 to his hometown to the Santa Maria degli Angeli church. His remains were exhumed in that church on 28 January 2012 for canonical inspection and for the collection of relics. The reconnaissance - lasting about six hours - found most of the skeleton with the skullcap. Hair was found in addition to 25 teeth with two of those teeth still attached to the jaw. Pieces of his cassock were found as was a single button.

Beatification
The beatification process opened on 24 April 1830 under Pope Pius VIII and the late priest became titled as a Servant of God. Two local processes in Naples in addition to Salerno were held and both were validated on 30 September 1842 so that the cause could continue under the direction of the Congregation for Rites. Pope Pius IX approved his life of heroic virtue and proclaimed him to be Venerable on 14 August 1854.

The miracle required for his beatification (a healing medicine and science fail to explain) was investigated from 11 February 1953 until 17 November 1954 in Campagna and received validation decades later from the Congregation for the Causes of Saints on 31 March 2008. Medical experts issued unanimous approval (7 out of 7) the healing in question to be a legitimate miracle on 4 March 2010; theologians agreed with the verdict on 19 November 2010 (also unanimous) as did the cardinal and bishop members of the C.C.S. on 5 April 2011. It received final approval of Pope Benedict XVI on 27 June 2011 who appointed Cardinal Angelo Amato - the prefect of the Congregation for the Causes of Saints - to preside over the beatification. It was held in Terme on 24 June 2012.

The current postulator for this cause (since 2007) is Fr. Francesco Rivieccio.

See also
 Catholic Church in Italy
 List of beatified people

References

External links
 Hagiography Circle
 Official website
 Litterae apostolicae

1707 births
1788 deaths
18th-century Neapolitan people
Beatifications by Pope Benedict XVI
Italian beatified people
18th-century Italian Roman Catholic priests
Clergy from Naples